Johannes (Hans) Blokland (born 5 March 1943 in Oegstgeest, South Holland) is a former Dutch politician and former Member of the European Parliament. He is a member of the ChristianUnion, former treasurer of the Independence and Democracy group, and former vice-chair of the European Parliament's Committee on the Environment, Public Health and Food Safety.

He is also a former member of the Committee on Civil Liberties, Justice and Home Affairs, a former substitute for the Committee on Transport and Tourism, a former member of the delegation to the EU–Armenia, EU–Azerbaijan and EU–Georgia Parliamentary Cooperation Committees, a former member of the delegation to the EU–Kazakhstan, EU–Kyrgyzstan and EU–Uzbekistan Parliamentary Cooperation Committees, and for relations with Tajikistan, Turkmenistan and Mongolia, and a former substitute for the delegation for relations with the People's Republic of China.

Career 
 Higher degree in economics (1970)
 Doctorate in economics (1976)
 Researcher, Netherlands Economic Institute (1969–1976)
 Lecturer, Erasmus University (1971–1988)
 Head of the planning department, National Land Use Planning Agency (1976–1980)
 Head of the research department, Central Statistical Office (1980–1982)
 Member of the Advisory Committee on Foreigners, Ministry of Justice (1987–2000)
 Vice-Chairman of the GPV local party (1973–1974)
 Member of the executive, GPV provincial party (1976–1977)
 provincial chairman, GPV (1977–1981)
 Member of the GPV administrative committee (1978–1984)
 Chairman of the GPV (1984–1994)
 Member of the Capelle aan den IJssel Municipal Council (1974–1994)
 Alderman of Capelle aan den IJssel (1982–1986)
 Member of the South Holland Provincial Council (1982–1995)
 Member of the European Parliament (1994–2009)
 Co-Chairman of the EDN Group (1997–1999)
 Co-Chairman of the EDD Group (1999–2004)
 Vice-Chairman and Treasurer of the IND/DEM Group (?–2009)

References 
  Parlement.com biography

External links 
  European Parliament biography
 

1943 births
Living people
Aldermen in South Holland
People from Capelle aan den IJssel
Christian Union (Netherlands) MEPs
Dutch economists
Members of the Provincial Council of South Holland
Municipal councillors in South Holland
Erasmus University Rotterdam alumni
Academic staff of Erasmus University Rotterdam
MEPs for the Netherlands 1994–1999
MEPs for the Netherlands 1999–2004
MEPs for the Netherlands 2004–2009
Party chairs of the Netherlands
People from Oegstgeest
Reformed Political League MEPs